Sir James Roll, 1st Baronet (9 December 1846 – 30 January 1927) was Lord Mayor of London for 1920–21.

He was Master of the Worshipful Company of Glovers

Arms

See also 

 Roll baronets

References 

 https://www.ukwhoswho.com/view/10.1093/ww/9780199540891.001.0001/ww-9780199540884-e-202366

1846 births
1927 deaths
20th-century lord mayors of London
19th-century British politicians
20th-century British politicians